Quest is an American digital multicast television network owned by Tegna Inc. The network specializes in travel, historical, science, and adventure-focused documentary and reality series aimed at adults between the ages of 25 and 54.

The network, which broadcasts in 480i standard definition, is available in several large and mid-sized markets via digital subchannel affiliations with broadcast television stations. Stations have the option of placing their Quest-affiliated subchannels on cable television providers serving their market (via existing carriage agreements for local broadcast stations) to provide additional local coverage.

History
The formation of Quest was announced on November 7, 2017, as a partnership between Cooper Media (a company formed at that same time to serve as the owner of Quest and its sister network, Justice Network) and Tegna Inc. The network was given an expected launch date of January 2018. Tegna tapped several of its 46 owned or operated television stations to serve as the network's charter affiliates, in exchange for maintaining a minority ownership stake in the network.

The network was officially launched on January 29, 2018, at 6:00 p.m. Eastern Time with an episode ("Air Ambush") of the 2006–08 History series Dogfights as the network's inaugural program.

In May 2019, it was announced that Tegna would be acquiring both the Justice Network and Quest.

Programming
Quest's program schedule consists of a mix of programs that originally aired on A&E, Discovery, History, Smithsonian, and truTV cable networks, as well as those which premiered in 3D (aired on Quest in traditional 2D) from the now-defunct DirecTV channel 3net:

 10 Things You Don't Know About
 America's Book of Secrets
 American Restoration
 American Underworld
 Ancient Discoveries
 Appalachian Outlaws
 Auction Kings
 Aussie Gold Hunters
 The Aviators
 Ax Men
 Backroad Bounty
 Brojects in the House
 Build It Bigger
 Cajun Pawn Stars
 Chasing Monsters
 Command Decisions
 Dangerous Flights
 The Detonators
 Dogfights
 Doomsday Preppers
 Dual Survival
 Factory Made
 Food Factory USA
 Giant Lobster Hunters
 How Booze Built America
 How to Build Everything
 How the Earth Was Made
 How the States Got Their Shapes
 How Do They Do It?
 Huge Moves
 Ice Road Truckers
 Life After People
 Live Fire
 The Lost Evidence
 Machines: How They Work
 Made by Destruction
 Massive Moves
 Mayday: Air Disaster
 Mega Builders
 Mega Movers
 Mega Shippers
 Modern Marvels
 Modern Marvels: Engineering Disasters
 MonsterQuest
 Most Daring
 MysteryQuest
 Myth Hunters
 Only in America with Larry the Cable Guy
 Seconds from Disaster
 Shipping Wars
 Storage Wars: Texas
 Storm Chasers
 Unchained Reaction
 What Could Possibly Go Wrong?
 Yukon Gold

Affiliates
, Quest has affiliation agreements with television stations in 67 media markets (including 24 of the top 30) encompassing 35 states, covering 60.81% of all households with at least one television set in the United States.

When its launch was announced, the network reached a charter affiliation agreement with network co-partner Tegna, which initially planned to debut the network on 22 of its television stations. On December 20, 2017, the network signed a multi-station agreement with Spanish-language broadcaster TelevisaUnivision USA to carry its programming on five of its Univision and UniMás owned-and-operated television stations as well as one station affiliated with Justice Network.

List of affiliates

References

External links
 

2018 establishments in Georgia (U.S. state)
Television networks in the United States
Companies based in Atlanta
Television channels and stations established in 2018
Quest (American TV network)
Travel television
Tegna Inc.